John P. Fraser  (born ) is a Canadian politician who currently serves as the interim leader of the Ontario Liberal Party. Fraser previously served as interim leader from June 2018 to March 2020. Fraser is the member of provincial parliament (MPP) for Ottawa South and was first elected in a by-election on August 1, 2013.

Following the resignation of Kathleen Wynne as party leader after the party's poor performance in the 2018 election, he was unanimously endorsed by the other six remaining Liberal MPPs to become interim leader on June 13, 2018 and unanimously elected the next day by a vote of the party executive and riding association presidents.

After Steven Del Duca was elected Liberal leader on March 7, 2020, Fraser remained the party's parliamentary leader as Del Duca didn't have a seat in the legislature.

Background
Fraser was born in Ottawa and grew up in Elmvale Acres and Alta Vista. According to his biography, "he spearheaded the Our Children, Our Hospital campaign to save the Cardiac Care Unit at CHEO and organized a fundraiser which raised $20,000 for the Heron Road Emergency Food Bank, [and] for a number of years, he served as a palliative care volunteer at the General Campus of the Ottawa Hospital and as a coach to the Canterbury Mustangs Football Team."

Fraser was the parliamentary assistant to the Minister of Health and Long-Term Care. As the parliamentary assistant, Fraser led the development of a comprehensive strategy for palliative and end-of-life care in Ontario, including a $75 million investment. In March 2018, Fraser was part of an announcement to deliver $105 million investment in CHEO to improve mental health and special needs services for children.

As MPP, Fraser led an initiative that would ensure all children have their vision tested before entering senior kindergarten as well as introducing legislation aimed at protecting vulnerable workers and increasing transparency in government. Fraser sponsored several private member's bills including Bill 53, The Protecting Passenger Safety Act 2014 which would stiffen penalties for individuals who transport passengers for compensation without a licence, permit, or authorization. Fraser has worked closely with other Members of Provincial Parliament on legislation including being part of the team that brought forward Rowan's Law, concussion legislation that will protect young athletes; as well as a bill that established "Remembrance Week" in Ontario.

Prior to being elected, Fraser was former Premier Dalton McGuinty's local constituency assistant for 14 years. Fraser spent 18 years managing small- and medium-sized local businesses before entering the public service.

He is married to Linda Fraser and has three children and three grandchildren.

Politics
In 2013, Fraser ran as the Liberal candidate in the riding of Ottawa South in a by-election to replace Dalton McGuinty who had just retired. He defeated Progressive Conservative candidate Matt Young by 1,238 votes. He faced Young again in the 2014 election this time defeating him by 8,610 votes.

In the 2018 Ontario general election, Fraser was re-elected MPP for Ottawa South, receiving 5,464 more votes than the Progressive Conservative Party of Ontario candidate Karin Howard. As a result of her party's poor performance in the election, Premier Kathleen Wynne resigned as leader of the Ontario Liberal Party on election night. On June 13, the Liberal caucus unanimously endorsed Fraser to serve as the party's interim leader On June 14, he was appointed interim leader following a vote by caucus members, the party executive, and riding association presidents.

He was re-elected in the 2022 Ontario general election and again became interim leader of the Ontario Liberal Party effective August 3, 2022.

Electoral record

References

External links
 

1958 births
Living people
Businesspeople from Ottawa
Ontario Liberal Party MPPs
Politicians from Ottawa
21st-century Canadian politicians